Guna is a city and a municipality in Guna district in the Indian state of Madhya Pradesh. It is the administrative headquarters of Guna District and is located on the banks of Parbati river.

Geography 
It has an average elevation of 474 metres (1555 ft).

Climate

Demographics 

As of 2011 Indian Census, Guna had a total population of 180,935, of which 94,464 were males and 86,471 were females. Population within the age group of 0 to 6 years was 24,447. The total number of literates in Guna was 125,295, which constituted 69.2% of the population with male literacy of 75.3% and female literacy of 62.6%. The effective literacy rate of 7+ population of Guna was 80.1%, of which male literacy rate was 87.2% and female literacy rate was 72.3%. The Scheduled Castes and Scheduled Tribes population was 27,631 and 3,623 respectively. Guna had 34383 households in 2011.

 India census, Guna has a population of 137,132. Males constitute 52.8% of the population and females 47.2%. Total number of literates was 91,322, giving a crude literacy rate 66.6% and an effective literacy rate of 78.4%. In Guna, a population of 20,648 (15%) was in the age range of 0–6 years.

Education
For higher education engineering private college Jaypee University of Engineering & Technology (JUET)  situated near guna around 35 km.

References

External links
Official Website of Guna District
Playotel Premier Guna 

 
Cities and towns in Guna district
Cities in Madhya Pradesh